Oestrophasia uncana is a species of bristle fly in the family Tachinidae.

Distribution
Brazil.

References

Dexiinae
Taxa named by Johan Christian Fabricius
Insects described in 1805
Diptera of South America